Memorial Hall is an historic hall located at 30 School Street in Milford, Massachusetts. It was built as a Civil War tribute.

Designed by Milford architect Frederick Swasey in the Richardsonian Romanesque style, the hall was built in 1884 from local Milford granite and Longmeadow brownstone. The building features carved brownstone figures and panels inscribed "Grant" and "Farragut". On the front of the hall, there is a bronze plaque inscribed with Lincoln's Gettysburg Address.

The building was added to the National Register of Historic Places in 1985.  It underwent a restoration in 2001–2002. It is now home to the Milford Historical Commission, whose museum is open to visitors Thursdays from 1-4 pm or by appointment.

See also
National Register of Historic Places listings in Worcester County, Massachusetts

References

External links
 Milford Historical Commission

Museums in Worcester County, Massachusetts
History museums in Massachusetts
Richardsonian Romanesque architecture in Massachusetts
Cultural infrastructure completed in 1884
Massachusetts
Milford, Massachusetts
National Register of Historic Places in Worcester County, Massachusetts
1884 establishments in Massachusetts
Massachusetts in the American Civil War